Love in a Small Town is the third studio album by American country music artist K. T. Oslin, released by RCA Records in 1990. "Two Hearts", "Come Next Monday", "Mary and Willie", "You Call Everybody Darling" and "Cornell Crawford" were released as singles. The album reached #5 on the Top Country Albums chart and has been certified Gold by the RIAA.

Track listing

Personnel
Compiled from liner notes.
Eddie Bayers - drums
Barry Beckett - keyboards
Richard Bennett - acoustic guitar
John R. Crowder - bass guitar
Bill Cuomo - keyboards
Costo Davis - keyboards
Owen Hale - drums
Keith Hinton - acoustic guitar, electric guitar
David Hungate - bass guitar
Mike Lawler - synthesizer
Larrie Londin - drums
Gary Lunn - bass guitar
Terry McMillan - harmonica
Bobby Ogdin - keyboards
K.T. Oslin - lead vocals, keyboards, background vocals on "Come Next Monday"
Don Potter - acoustic guitar
Michael Rhodes - bass guitar
Joe Scaife - background vocals on "Come Next Monday"
Harry Stinson - drums
Joe Van Dyke - keyboards
Mitch Watkins - electric guitar
John D. Willis - acoustic guitar
Reggie Young - electric guitar
Dino Zimmerman - electric guitar

Charts

Weekly charts

Year-end charts

References

1990 albums
Albums produced by K. T. Oslin
K. T. Oslin albums
RCA Records albums